Portage Township, Ohio may refer to:

Portage Township, Hancock County, Ohio
Portage Township, Ottawa County, Ohio
Portage Township, Wood County, Ohio

See also
Portage Township (disambiguation)

Ohio township disambiguation pages